The 1988 Stockholm Open was a men's tennis tournament played on hard courts and part of the 1988 Nabisco Grand Prix and took place at the Kungliga tennishallen in Stockholm, Sweden. It was the 20th edition of the tournament and was held from 31 October through 6 November 1988. Third-seeded Boris Becker  won the singles title.

Finals

Singles

 Boris Becker defeated  Peter Lundgren, 6–4, 6–1, 6–1
 It was Becker's 6th singles title of the year and the 18th of his career.

Doubles

 Kevin Curren /  Jim Grabb defeated  Paul Annacone /  John Fitzgerald, 7–5, 6–4

References

External links
 
 Association of Tennis Professionals – tournament profile
 International Tennis Federation – tournament edition details

Stockholm Open
Stockholm Open
Stockholm Open
Stockholm Open
Stockholm Open
1980s in Stockholm